Arthur Dillon (1750–1794) was an Irish Catholic aristocrat born in England who inherited the ownership of a regiment that served France under the Ancien Régime during the American Revolutionary War and then the French First Republic during the War of the First Coalition. After serving in political positions during the early years of the revolution, he was executed in Paris as a royalist during the Reign of Terror in 1794.

Birth and origins 
Arthur was born on 3 September 1750 at Bray Wick in Berkshire, England. He was the second son of Henry Dillon and his wife Charlotte Lee. His father was the 11th Viscount Dillon.

Arthur's mother was a daughter of George Lee, 2nd Earl of Lichfield. He had six siblings, who are listed in his father's article.

Colonel 
On 25 August 1767, at the age of 16, he became colonel of Dillon's Regiment taking over from his father who had been absentee colonel for twenty years from 1747 to 1767 after the death of his uncle Edward at Lauffeld in 1747.

First marriage and children 
At eighteen, Colonel Dillon married a second cousin, Therese-Lucy de Rothe (1751–1782).

Arthur and Thérèse-Lucie had two children:
George (who died at the age of two)
Henriette-Lucy, or Lucie (by marriage, Henriette-Lucy, Marquise de La Tour du Pin Gouvernet), a memoiriste of the Revolutionary period and the Napoleonic era.

He was to become the grandfather of Arthur Dillon, also a military officer.

American Revolutionary War 
In 1778 France entered the American Revolutionary War (1775–1783) on the American side. Colonel Dillon sailed with his regiment to the Caribbean to campaign against Britain under the command of D'Estaing. In 1779 he and his regiment fought at the Capture of Grenada against British forces under George Macartney. They landed on 2 July, and stormed the Hospital Hill which the British had chosen as the centre of their resistance. Arthur personally led one of the storm parties, his brother Henry led another. Macartney surrendered on 5 July. On 6 July 1779 a British fleet under appeared off the coast of the island and the naval engagement of the Battle of Grenada was fought. In September and October 1779 Dillon fought at the Siege of Savannah where he was promoted brigadier. After the Treaty of Paris, he became governor of Tobago.

Second marriage 
His first wife having died, he married a wealthy French Creole widow from Martinique, Laure de Girardin de Montgérald, the Comtesse de la Touche, by whom he had six children, including Élisabeth Françoise 'Fanny' Dillon, later wife of Henri Gatien Bertrand.

Later life, death, and timeline 

He returned to Paris to represent Martinique in the Estates General of 1789 as a democratic, reformist royalist.

Dillon assumed military duties at a very difficult time for noble officers of the old army. On 29 April 1792 his cousin Théobald Dillon was lynched by his own troops after a minor skirmish. After the Battle of Valmy, when Charles Dumouriez returned to the Belgian frontier with the greater part of the army, he detached Dillon with 16,000 troops to form the rump of the Army of the Ardennes around 1 October 1792. Two weeks later Dillon was called to Paris for questioning and was ultimately arrested on 1 July 1793 despite being stoutly defended by his aide-de-camp François Séverin Marceau-Desgraviers. He was condemned for alleged participation in a prison conspiracy and executed by guillotine on 13 April 1794. In his final moments he mounted the scaffold shouting, "Vive le roi!" (Long live the king).

Works 
Compte-rendu au ministre de la guerre (Paris, 1792) ;
Exposition des principaux événements qui ont eu le plus d'influence sur la révolution française (Paris, 1792).

See also 
Distillerie Dillon

Notes and references

Notes

Citations

Sources 
 
  – Coss to Exc

Further reading 
 
 

1750 births
1794 deaths
French generals
Military leaders of the French Revolutionary Wars
French Republican military leaders of the French Revolutionary Wars
English people of Irish descent
French people of Irish descent
French people executed by guillotine during the French Revolution
People from Maidenhead
Executed people from Berkshire
French military personnel of the American Revolutionary War
Names inscribed under the Arc de Triomphe
Younger sons of viscounts